Joseph Francis Castaldo : Born December 22, 1927 – , Manhattan, New York Died January 27, 2000 in Philadelphia Pennsylvania was an American composer of classical music and a teacher of musical composition and music.

Castaldo was an important figure in Philadelphia musical life in the ’60s, ’70s, '80s and '90's, having served as the Head of the Philadelphia Musical Academy and guided that institution’s evolution into what is now the University of the Arts.

Works

Orchestral

Chamber
Theoria for fifteen winds, piano and percussion
Askesis (Cycles II) for 14 players
Elegy (on Texts of Rilke) for soprano and small orchestra
Protogenesis (for Fels Planetarium)

Full
Lacrimosa for strings
Lacrimosa II for strings
Epigrams for piano and orchestra
The Eye of God
Concerto for Cello
Concerto for viola and orchestra (1988–1989)
I. Lament
II. Canticle-Celebration
Soliloquy and Dialogues for clarinet and string orchestra
Landscapes
I. Snake River

Chamber
Lament for viola and piano
Lament for violoncello and piano (1988)
Lament for clarinet and piano
Dedications for flute and bassoon (1988)
Sarabande for solo violoncello
Two Pieces for solo clarinet (1985, revised 1987)
Where Silence Reigns for violin, violoncello and piano
Four Songs from Rilke for voice and piano
Kannon for solo flute (1978)
Memento Mori for horn, piano and percussion (1991)
Photographia for baritone voice, piano and percussion (1972)
Chamber Sonata for violin and viola
Dichotomy for woodwind quintet
Contrasts for solo harp (1956)
String Quartet (1978), #2
String Quartet (1994), #3
String Quartet (1954), #1

Piano
Toccata
Sonatina
Kaleidoscope
Sonata (1961)
Moments
Haiku
Metaphors

Choral
Ancient Liturgy (first performance, 1990)
 Flight, Sacred Cantata for Soprano, Narrator, Mixed Chorus, Symphonic Winds, and Percussion; Text by John Shoemaker; Commissioned by the Temple University Choirs, Robert Page, Director.

References

External links
A former student remembers Joseph Castaldo

1927 births
20th-century classical composers
2000 deaths
University of the Arts (Philadelphia) faculty
Male classical composers
20th-century male musicians